Guy Du Fresnay (1877-1937) was a French writer and silent film director best known for his silent films of the late 1910s and early 1920s. He was awarded the Legion of Honor in 1919.

He is the descendant of French writer Maria Du Fresnay and of French knight Ange Du Fresnay as well as the ancestor of French essayist and economist Philippe Du Fresnay.

Biography
He started as a writer, then became a scenarist and film director.

He worked notably for the Gaumont Film Company.

Filmography
Démon du foyer, Le (1912)
Jardin du pirate, Le (1918)
Cathédrale merveilleuse, La (1918)
De la coupe aux lèvres (1920)
Ami des montagnes, L' (1920)
Ailes s'ouvrent, Les (1921)
Margot (1922) 
Frou-Frou (1923)

Bibliography 

Magazine "Ciné pour tous", No 66, 20 Mai 1921, lien url: http://www.cineressources.net/images/periodiques/o000/401.pdf
Magazine "Cinéa", No 52, 5 Mai 1922, page 1, lien url: http://www.cineressources.net/images/periodiques/o000/494.pdf

See also
 Ange Du Fresnay
 Maria Du Fresnay
 Marie-Caroline Du Fresnay
 Philippe Du Fresnay

References

External links 

French film directors
Silent film directors
1877 births
1937 deaths